This is a list of television series that were produced, distributed, or owned by Warner Bros. Discovery's brands, including Warner Bros. Television Studios, Warner Bros. Animation, Hanna-Barbera, Warner Horizon Television, Warner Horizon Unscripted Television, Telepictures, HBO, TBS, TNT Originals, TruTV, CNN, Cartoon Network, Discovery Channel, and several predecessor companies.

Warner Bros.

Warner Bros. Television Studios

Blue Ribbon Content

Alloy Entertainment

Warner Horizon Television

Warner Horizon Unscripted Television

Shed Media

Telepictures

Warner Bros. International Television Production

Warner Bros. Television Studios UK

Hanna-Barbera Studios Europe

Lazytown Entertainment

Ricochet

Twenty Twenty Television

Watershed Television

Wall to Wall Media

Shed Productions

Shed Media Scotland

Headstrong Pictures

Renegade Pictures

Yalli Productions

Koco Drama

Warner Bros. Animation

Hanna-Barbera

Ruby-Spears (pre-1991)

Cartoon Network Studios

Williams Street

Warner Premiere Digital

Turner Program Services

Lorimar Television
 Rowan & Martin's Laugh-In (1968–1973) (Broadcast syndication rights only)
 The Good Life (with Screen Gems, 1971–1972) 
 The Waltons (1972–1981)
 Doc Elliot (1973–1974) (co-production with Corsican Productions Inc.)
 Apple's Way (1974–1975)
 The Blue Knight (1975–1976)
 Helter Skelter (TV miniseries) (1976)
 Sybil (TV miniseries) (1976)
 Eight Is Enough (1977–1981)
 Dallas (1978–1991)
 Kaz (1978–1979)
 Flatbush (1979)
 Knots Landing (1979–1993) (co-produced with Roundelay Productions   and Roundelay-MF Productions 
 Skag (1980)
 Flamingo Road (1980–1982) (co produced with MF Productions)
 The People's Court (1981–1993)
 Falcon Crest (1981–1990) (co-produced with Amanda and MF Productions)
 King's Crossing (1982)
 Boone (1983)
 Two Marriages (1983–1984)
 Just Our Luck (1983) (co-production with Lawrence Gordon Productions)
 Love Connection (1983–1993)
 Maggie Briggs (1984) (co-production with Chagrin Productions)
 Christopher Columbus (TV miniseries) (1984)
 Berrenger's (1985) (co-production with Roundelay Productions)
 Detective in the House (1985)
 Our Family Honor (1985–1986) (co-produced by Lawrence Gordon/Charles Gordon Productions)
 The Best Times (1985) (co-production with Beechwood Productions)
 The Redd Foxx Show (1986) (co-production with Thunder Road Productions)
 Mama's Family (1986–1990 version, distribution only)
 ALF (1986–1990) (currently distributed by Shout! Factory in United States only, international distribution handled by Warner Bros. Television)
 The Hogan Family (1986–1991) (Co-produced by Miller-Boyett Productions and TAL Productions, Inc. )
 Perfect Strangers (1986–1993) (co-produced by Miller-Boyett Productions)
 The Slap Maxwell Story (1987) (co-production with You and Me Kid Productions)
 Full House (1987–1993) (co-produced by Jeff Franklin Productions and Miller-Boyett Productions)
 Midnight Caller (1988–1991) (co-produced by December 3 Productions and Gangbuster Films, Inc.)
 Paradise (1988–1991) (co-production with Roundelay Productions)
 Freddy's Nightmares (1988–1990) (with New Line Television and Stone Television)
 Fun House (1988–1990) (with Stone Television)
 Studio 5-B (1989)
 Nearly Departed (1989) (co-produced by Baskin-Schulman Productions)
 3rd Degree (1989–1990) (co-production with Kline and Friends Productions and Burt and Bert Productions)
 Island Son (1989–1990) (co-produced with Malli Point Productions)
 Family Matters (1989–1993) (co-produced by Bickley-Warren Productions and Miller-Boyett Productions)
 The Family Man (1990–1991) (Co-production with Catalina Television and Miller-Boyett Productions)
 Going Places (1990–1991) (Co-produced by Miller-Boyett Productions)
 D.E.A. (1990) (co-produced by Dark Ink Inc. Productions)
 Gabriel's Fire (1990–1991) (co-produced by Crystal Beach Entertainment and Coleman Luck Productions)
 It (1990) (co-production with DawnField Entertainment, The Königsberg/Sanitsky Company and Green/Epstein Productions)
 Pros and Cons (1991–1992) (co-production with Schenck/Cardea Productions)
 Dark Justice (1991–1993) (co-produced by Magnum Productions with David Salzman Entertainment)
 Reasonable Doubts (1991–1993) (co-produced with December 3 Productions)
 Homefront (1991–1993) (co-produced with Roundelay Productions and Latham/Lechowick Productions)
 I'll Fly Away (1991–1993) (co-produced with Brand-Falsey Productions)
 Sisters (1991–1993)
 Step by Step (1991–1993) (co-produced by Bickley-Warren Productions and Miller-Boyett Productions
 Bill & Ted's Excellent Adventures (1992) (co-production with Orion Television, Nelson '91, & Innuendo Productions) (co-distributed with MGM Television)
 Scorch (1992) (co-production with Allan Katz Productions, Saban/Scherick Productions and Honeyland Productions)
 Hangin' with Mr. Cooper (1992–1993) (Co-produced by Bickley-Warren Productions  and Jeff Franklin Productions)
 Bodies of Evidence (1992–1993)
 Shaky Ground (1992–1993) (co-production with Keyes Brothers Productions)
 Going to Extremes (1992–93) (Co-produced by Brand/Falsey Productions)
 Time Trax (1993) (co-produced by Gary Nardino Productions)
 It Had to Be You (1993) (co-produced with Highest Common Denominator Productions)

Lorimar-Telepictures

ZIV International
All rights to these series have reverted to their original owners.

 Fables of the Green Forest (1978)
 Little Lulu (1978)
 The Adventures of Captain Future (1980)
 Angel (1980)
 Candy (1981)
 King Arthur & the Knights of the Round Table (1981)

The Wolper Organization (post-1970)
 Appointments with Destiny (1971–1973)
 American Heritage (1973–1975)
 Primal Man (1973–1975)
 Sandburg's Lincoln (1974–1976)
 Chico and the Man (1974–1978)
 Welcome Back, Kotter (1975–1979)
 Roots (1977)
 Roots: The Next Generations (1979)
 North and South (1985–1994) (co-production with Warner Bros. Television and Amy Productions Inc. of Delaware)
 Salem's Lot (2004) (co-production with Warner Bros. Television and Coote/Hayes Productions)

Seven Arts Television
 Marine Boy (1967)
 Johnny Cypher in Dimension Zero (1968)

Turner Entertainment Co.
This includes most of the pre-May 1986 MGM Television library, which Warner Bros. Television Distribution owns through its 1996 acquisition of Turner Entertainment.
 MGM Parade (1955–1956)
 The Thin Man (1957–1959) (Based on the 1934 film and its sequels by MGM)
 Northwest Passage (1958–1959)
 National Velvet (1960)
 The Best of the Post (1960)
 The Islanders (1960–1961)
 The Asphalt Jungle (1961)
 Cain's Hundred (1961–1962)
 Dr. Kildare (1961–1966) (Based on the 1937 movie Internes Can't Take Money and its sequels by MGM)
 Father of the Bride (1961–1962) (Based on the 1950 film and its sequel by MGM)
 Sam Benedict (1962–1963)
 The Eleventh Hour (1962–1964)
 The Lieutenant (1963–1964)
 Harry's Girls (1963)
 The Travels of Jaimie McPheeters (1963–1964)
 Mr. Novak (1963–1965)
 Gilligan's Island (1964–1967) (produced by United Artists Television and CBS Productions)
 Made in America (1964)
 Many Happy Returns (1964–1965)
 Mickey (1964–1965)
 The Man from U.N.C.L.E. (1964–1968)
 A Man Called Shenandoah (1965–1966)
 Please Don't Eat the Daisies (1965–1967) (Based on the 1960 movie of the same name by MGM)
 Tom and Jerry (1965–1972)
 Daktari (1966–1969)
 Preview Tonight (1966) (episode "Seven Good Years and Seven Lean")
 The Rounders (1966–1967)
 The Girl from U.N.C.L.E. (1966–1967)
 Jericho (1966–1967)
 The Forsyte Saga (1967 mini-series)
 Off to See the Wizard (1967–1968) (Based on The Wizard of Oz)
 Hondo (1967) (Based on the 1953 film by Warner Bros.)
 Maya (1967–1968) (Based on the 1966 film by MGM)
 Then Came Bronson (1969–1970)
 The Courtship of Eddie's Father (1969–1972) (Based on the 1960 film by MGM)
 Medical Center (1969–1976)
 Young Dr. Kildare (1972)
 Assignment Vienna (1972)
 Hello Mother, Goodbye! (1973 pilot for NBC starring Bette Davis)
 Adam's Rib (1973) (Based on the 1949 film by MGM)
 Hawkins (1973–1974)
 Shaft (1973–1974)
 The New Adventures of Gilligan (1974–1975) (produced by Filmation Associates)
 Adams of Eagle Lake (1975) (produced by MGM Television and Andy Griffith Enterprises)
 The New Tom and Jerry Show (1975–1977) (produced by MGM Television and Hanna-Barbera)
 Bronk (1975–1976)
 The Practice (1976–1977)
 The Montefuscos (1976)
 Jigsaw John (1976)
 Executive Suite (1976–1977)
 How the West Was Won (1977 mini-series, 1978–1979)
 CHiPs (1977–1983) (produced by Rosner Television and MGM Television)
 Logan's Run (1977–1978) (Based on the 1976 film by MGM)
 Lucan (1977–1978)
 The French Atlantic Affair (1979 mini-series)
 Beyond Westworld (1980) (produced by MGM Television and Low Shaw Productions)
 The Tom and Jerry Comedy Show (1980–1982) (produced by MGM Television and Filmation Associates)
 McClain's Law (1981–1982)
 Chicago Story (1982)
 Gavilan (1982–1983) (produced by MGM Television and Mandy Films)
 Meatballs & Spaghetti (1982) (produced by MGM Television, Intermedia Entertainment and Marvel Productions)
 Pandamonium (1982) (produced by MGM Television, Intermedia Entertainment Company and Marvel Productions)
 Gilligan's Planet (1982–1983) (produced by MGM Television and Filmation Associates)
 Thicke of the Night (1983)
 The Yearling (1983–1985) (Based on the 1946 film by MGM)
 Empire (1984)
 Jessie (1984) (produced by MGM Television and Lindsay Wagner-David Gerber Productions)
 Mighty Orbots (1984–1985) (produced by MGM Television, Intermedia Entertainment and TMS Entertainment)
 Tom & Jerry Kids (1990–1993) (co-produced with Hanna-Barbera)
 The Wizard of Oz (1990) (co-produced with DIC Entertainment, currently co-owned with WildBrain, Ltd.)
 Droopy, Master Detective (1993) (co-produced with Hanna-Barbera)
 Tom and Jerry Tales (2006–2008) (produced by Warner Bros. Animation)
 Coma (2012) (produced by Warner Bros. Television, Scott Free Productions and Sony Pictures Television)
 The Tom and Jerry Show (2014–2021) (produced by Warner Bros. Animation and Renegade Animation)
 Dorothy and the Wizard of Oz (2017–2020) (produced by Warner Bros. Animation)
 Tom and Jerry in New York (2021–present) (produced by Warner Bros. Animation)

Castle Rock Entertainment
 Seinfeld (1989–1998) (with Giggling Goose Productions, West/Shapiro Productions & Fred Barron Productions)
 Homeroom (1989)
 Ann Jillian (1989–1990)
 New Attitude (1990)
 Morton & Hayes (1991)
 Sessions (1991) (co-production with HBO)
 The Powers That Be (1992) (with Act III Television, ELP Communications and Columbia Pictures Television)
 Great Scott! (1992) (with Claverly One Productions)
 Thea (1993–1994)
 The Second Half (1993–1994)
 704 Hauser (1994, pilot only)
 The Lazarus Man (1996)
 Boston Common (1996–1997) (with KoMut Entertainment)
 You're the One (1998)
 Reunited (1998)
 The Army Show (1998)
 Mission Hill (1999–2002) (with Film Roman & Bill Oakley/Josh Weinstein Productions)
 Movie Stars (1999)
 The Michael Richards Show (2000–2001)
 Zero Effect (2001, pilot) (with Warner Bros. Television)
 Lucky (2003)

New Line Television

Home Box Office, Inc.

HBO Documentary Films

HBO Europe

HBO Asia

HBO Latin America

HBO Downtown Productions 
These series produced by this HBO division are currently owned by HBO Entertainment/Warner Bros. Television (pre-1992 series) and Paramount Global/CBS Media Ventures (post-1991 series), except for Mystery Science Theater 3000 which is currently owned by Shout! Factory.
 Night After Night with Allan (1989–1992)
 Short Attention Span Theater (1989–1994)
 Sports Monster (1991)
 Stand Up, Stand Up (1991–1992)
 Inside the NFL (1992) (co-production with NFL Films)
 Women Aloud (1992–1993)
 Mystery Science Theater 3000 (1992–1996) (co-production with Best Brains)
 2 Drink Minimum (1993–1994)
 Politically Incorrect (1993–2002)
 Dr. Katz, Professional Therapist (1995–2002) (co-production with Tom Snyder Productions and Popular Arts Entertainment)
 Exit 57 (1995–1996)
 The Chris Rock Show (1997–2000) (co-production with HBO Entertainment, 3 Arts Entertainment and CR Enterprises, Inc.)

HBO Independent Productions

Time-Life Television

Talent Associates

Warner Bros. Discovery Networks

Discovery Channel

Animal Planet

TLC

Discovery Family

Oprah Winfrey Network

Food Network

Cooking Channel

HGTV

Travel Channel

Science Channel

Investigation Discovery

American Heroes Channel

Magnolia Network

Destination America

Discovery Life

Stage 13

Entertainment Group

TBS (Turner Entertainment Networks)

TNT Originals

TruTV 
TruTV's pre-2008 original programming library is currently owned by the E. W. Scripps Company due to their acquisition of the CourtTV franchise since 2018.

Cartoon Network

Sports Networks 
 Braves TBS Baseball (1973–2007)
 NASCAR on TBS (1983–2000)
 NBA on TBS (1984–2002)
 Inside the NBA (1984–present)
 NBA on TNT (1989–present)
 NFL on TNT (1990–1997)
 Olympics on TNT (1992, 1994, 1998) (co-production with CBS Sports)
 WCW Monday Nitro (1995–2001)
 Title Night (1998) (co-production with CBS Sports)
 Tennis on TNT (2000–2002)
 NASCAR on TNT (2001–2014)
 Major League Baseball on TBS (2007–present)
 NCAA March Madness (2011–present) (co-production with CBS Sports and National Collegiate Athletic Association)
 MetroPCS Friday Night Knockout (2015) (co-production with HBO and Top Rank)
 AEW Dynamite (2019–present)
 NHL on TNT (2021–present)

CNN Global

DC Entertainment

Television films, miniseries and specials

Warner Bros. Television Studios 
 Crosscurrent (1971)
 Probe (1972) (co-production with Leslie Stevens Productions)
 The Eyes of Charles Sand (1972)
 Climb An Angry Mountain (1972)
 Genesis II (1973) (co-production with Norway Productions)
 The Third Girl from the Left (1973)
 Deliver Us from Evil (1973)
 Cry Rape! (1973) (co-production with Leonard Freeman Productions)
 Key West (1973)
 Smile Jenny, You're Dead (1974)
 Wonder Woman (1974)
 Sidekicks (1974) (co-production with Cherokee Productions)
 Planet Earth (1974)
 The Healers (1974)
 The F.B.I. Story: The FBI Versus Alvin Karpis, Public Enemy Number One (1974) (co-production with Quinn Martin Productions)
 Attack on Terror: The FBI vs. the Ku Klux Klan (1975) (co-production with Quinn Martin Productions)
 Search for the Gods (1975) (co-production with The Douglas S. Cramer Company)
 Black Bart (1975)
 Death Among Friends (1975) (co-production with The Douglas S. Cramer Company)
 Strange New World (1975)
 Brinks: The Great Robbery (1976) (co-production with Quinn Martin Productions)
 Panache (1976)
 The Dark Side of Innocence (1976)
 Mayday at 40,000 Feet! (1976) (co-production with Andrew J. Fenady Productions)
 Carnival of the Animals (1976)
 Flood! (1976)
 The Possessed (1977)
 Fire! (1977) (co-production with Irwin Allen Productions)
 Bugs Bunny's Howl-oween Special (1977) (co-production with DePatie–Freleng Enterprises)
 A Cosmic Christmas (1977) (co-production with Nelvana)
 Bugs Bunny in King Arthur's Court (1978) (co-production with Chuck Jones Productions)
 A Death in Canaan (1978) (co-production with Chris/Rose Productions)
 The Return of Captain Nemo (1978) (co-production with Irwin Allen Productions)
 The New Maverick (1978) (co-production with Cherokee Productions)
 Zuma Beach (1978) (co-production with Bruce Cohn Curtis Films Ltd. and Edgar J. Scherick Associates)
 Katie: Portrait of a Centerfold (1978) (co-production with Moonlight Productions)
 Thou Shalt Not Commit Adultery (1978) (co-production with Edgar J. Scherick Productions)
 How Bugs Bunny Won the West (1978)
 The Pirate (1978) (co-production with Howard W. Koch Productions
 The Devil and Daniel Mouse (1978) (co-production with Nelvana)
 Someone's Watching Me! (1978)
 Champions: A Love Story (1979)
 The Corn Is Green (1979)
 Hanging by a Thread (1979) (co-production with Irwin Allen Productions)
 You Can't Take It with You (1979)
 Romie-0 and Julie-8 (1979) (co-production with Nelvana)
 Dummy (1979) (co-production with The Königsberg Company)
 Bugs Bunny's Thanksgiving Diet (1979)
 Intergalactic Thanksgiving (1979) (co-production with Nelvana)
 Friendships, Secrets and Lies (1979) (co-production with W/R – Wittman/Riche Productions)
 The Memory of Eva Ryker (1980) (co-production with Irwin Allen Productions)
 Haywire (1980) (co-production with Pando Productions)
 This Year's Blonde (1980)
 Daffy Duck's Easter Show (1980) (co-production with DePatie-Freleng Enterprises)
 Bugs Bunny's Bustin' Out All Over (1980) (co-production with Chuck Jones Enterprises)
 Easter Fever (1980) (co-production with Nelvana)
 The Scarlett O'Hara War (1980) (co-production with David L. Wolper-Stan Margulies Productions)
 Fun and Games (1980) (co-production with The Kainn-Gallo Company)
 The Women's Room (1980)
 Take Me Up to the Ball Game (1980) (co-production with Nelvana)
 The Bugs Bunny Mystery Special (1980)
 Daffy Duck's Thanks-for-Giving Special (1980)
 Crazy Times (1981)
 Scruples (1981) (co-production with Lou Step Productions)
 Don't Look Back: The Story of Leroy 'Satchel' Paige (1981) (co-production with Satie Productions Ltd., TBA Productions Inc. and Triseme)
 Fly Away Home (1981) (co-production with An Lac Productions)
 Bugs Bunny: All-American Hero (1981)
 Golden Gate (1981) (co-production with Lin Bolen Productions)
 Sidney Shorr: A Girl's Best Friend (1981) (co-production with Hajeno Productions)
 A Few Days in Weasel Creek (1981) (co-production with Hummingbird Productions)
 Splendor in the Grass (1981) (co-production with Katz-Gallin Productions and Half-Pint Productions)
 The Marva Collins Story (1981) (co-production with Hallmark Hall of Fame Productions and NRW Features)
 The Children Nobody Wanted (1981) (co-production with Blatt-Singer Productions)
 Bugs Bunny's Mad World of Television (1982)
 Murder Is Easy (1982) (co-production with CBS Entertainment Production and David L. Wolper-Stan Margulies Productions)
 Victims (1982) (co-production with Hajeno Productions)
 The Long Summer of George Adams (1982)
 Divorce Wars: A Love Story (1982)
 Thou Shalt Not Kill (1982) (co-production with Edgar J. Scherick Associates)
 The Kid with the Broken Halo (1982) (co-production with Satellite Productions and Zephyr Productions)
 The Letter (1982) (co-production with Hajeno Productions)
 Bare Essence (1982)
 Missing Children: A Mother's Story (1982) (co-production with Kayden/Gleason)
 The Night the Bridge Fell Down (1983) (co-production with Irwin Allen Productions)
 V: The Original Miniseries (1983) (co-production with Kenneth Johnson Productions)
 Cave-In! (1983) (co-production with Irwin Allen Productions)
 Sparkling Cyanide (1983)
 A Caribbean Mystery (1983)
 Found Money (1983) (co-production with Cypress Point Productions)
 V: The Final Battle (1984) (co-production with Blatt-Singer Productions)
 The Mystic Warrior (1984)
 No Man's Land (1984)
 Goldie and the Bears (1984)
 His Mistress (1984)
 The Bad Seed (1985) (co-production with Hajeno Productions)
 Murder with Mirrors (1985)
 Midas Valley (1985) (co-production with Edward S. Feldman Company)
 Thirteen at Dinner (1985)
 Between the Darkness and the Dawn (1985) (co-production with Doris Quinlan Productions and Entheos Unlimited Productions)
 Looney Tunes 50th Anniversary (1986) (co-production with Broadway Video)
 Dead Man's Folly (1986)
 Kung Fu: The Movie (1986) (co-production with Lou Step Productions)
 Dallas: The Early Years (1986) (co-production with Lorimar Television and Roundelay Productions)
 Killer in the Mirror (1986) (co-production with Litke/Grossbart Productions)
 Northstar (1986) (co-production with Daniel Grodnik Productions and Clyde Philips Productions)
 Murder in Three Acts (1986)
 Of Pure Blood (1986)
 Promise (1986) (co-production with Garner-Duchow Productions and Hallmark Hall of Fame Productions)
 The Betty Ford Story (1987) (co-production with David L. Wolper Productions)
 Nutcracker: Money, Madness & Murder (1987) (co-production with Green Arrow Productions)
 The Spirit (1987) (co-production with De Souza Productions and Von Zerneck-Samuels Productions)
 Napoleon and Josephine: A Love Story (1987) (co-production with David L. Wolper Productions)
 What Price Victory (1988) (co-production with David L. Wolper Productions)
 The Town Bully (1988) (co-production with Dick Clark Productions)
 Roots: The Gift (1988) (co-production with David L. Wolper Productions)
 Bugs vs. Daffy: Battle of the Music Video Stars (1988)
 The Man in the Brown Suit (1989) (co-production with Alan Shayne Productions)
 Bugs Bunny's Wild World of Sports (1989)
 My Name Is Bill W. (1989) (co-production with Garner-Duchow Productions and Hallmark Hall of Fame Productions)
 The Plot to Kill Hitler (1990)
 Murder in Mississippi (1990)
 Forbidden Nights (1990) (co-production with Tristine Rainer Productions)
 The Face of Fear (1990)
 Happy Birthday, Bugs!: 50 Looney Years (1990) (co-production with Smith-Hemion Productions)
 A Promise to Keep (1990) (co-production with Elliot Friedgen & Company & Sacret)
 When You Remember Me (1990)
 To My Daughter (1990) (co-production with Zacs Productions and Nugget Entertainment)
 Dillinger (1991) (co-production with David L. Wolper Productions)
 Bugs Bunny's Overtures to Disaster (1991)
 Babe Ruth (1991) (co-production with Elliot Friedgen & Company)
 Prisoner of Honor (1991) (co-production with Dreyfuss / James Productions and Etude)
 Survive the Savage Sea (1992) (co-production with Von Zerneck-Sertner Films)
 Taking Back My Life: The Nancy Ziegenmeyer Story (1992) (co-production with Elliot Friedgen & Company and Lytte Heshty Production)
 A House of Secrets and Lies (1992) (co-production with Chris/Rose Productions and Elliot Friedgen & Company)
 Empire City (1992)
 The Sands of Time (1992) (co-production with Dove Audio)
 Condition: Critical (1992) (co-production with Toots Productions)
 Killer Rules (1993) (co-production with Lee Rich Company)
 The Flood: Who Will Save Our Children? (1993) (co-production with Wolper Productions and Film Queensland)
 I'll Fly Away: Then and Now (1993) (co-production with Brand/Falsey Productions)
 No Child of Mine (1993) (co-production with Bonnie Raskin Productions and Green/Epstein Productions)
 Fatal Deception: Mrs. Lee Harvey Oswald (1993) (co-production with Elliot Friedgen & Company, David L. Wolper Productions and Bernard Sofronski Productions)
 Attack of the 50 Ft. Woman (1993)
 A Cool Like That Christmas (1993)
 Lies of the Heart: The Story of Laurie Kellogg (1994) (co-production with MDT Productions and Daniel H. Blatt Productions)
 Beyond Obsession (1994)
 Where Are My Children (1994) (co-production with Andrea Baynes Productions)
 The Innocent (1994) (co-production with Grammnet Productions)
 Someone She Knows (1994)
 Beyond Betrayal (1994) (co-production with Daniel H. Blatt Productions)
 Without Warning (1994) (co-production with The Wolper Organization and Mountain View Productions)
 How the West Was Fun (1994) (co-production with Dualstar Productions, Green/Epstein Productions and Kicking Horse Productions Ltd.)
 Because Mommy Works (1994) (co-production with Spring Creek Productions)
 Spenser: The Judas Goat (1994) (co-production with ABC Cable & International Broadcast Inc., Boardwalk Entertainment and Protocol Entertainment)
 A Walton Wedding (1995) (co-production with Amanda Productions, Eagle Point Production and The Lee Rich Company)
 Young at Heart (1995) (co-production with TS Productions)
 Virtual Seduction (1995)
 Divas (1995) (co-production with CBS Productions and The Thomas Carter Company)
 Prince for a Day (1995) (co-production with The Wolper Organization)
 It Was Him or Us (1995) (co-production with MDT Productions)
 The Thorn Birds: The Missing Years (1996) (co-production with The Wolper Organization and Village Roadshow Pictures Television)
 A Brother's Promise: The Dan Jansen Story (1996)
 Sins of Silence (1996) (co-production with Daniel H. Blatt Productions)
 Radiant City (1996) (co-production with Witt/Thomas Productions)
 Never Give Up: The Jimmy V Story (1996) (co-production with Daniel H. Blatt Productions and Sports Illustrated Television)
 Kidz in the Wood (1996) (co-production with Green/Epstein Productions and Pacific Motion Pictures)
 Once You Meet a Stranger (1996) (co-production with Michael Filerman Productions)
 Blue Rodeo (1996) (co-production with Lakeside Productions and The Paul Lussier Company)
 Dallas: J.R. Returns (1996) (co-production with Eagle Paint Production and Olive Productions)
 Childhood Sweetheart? (1997) (co-production with Daniel H. Blatt Productions and Lakeside Productions)
 The Dukes of Hazzard: Reunion! (1997) (co-production with Kudzu Productions)
 Knots Landing: Back to the Cul-de-Sac (1997)
 A Walton Easter (1997) (co-production with Eagle Point Production)
 Dallas: War of the Ewings (1998) (co-production with Lakeside Productions)
 Blade Squad (1998) (co-production with H. Beale Company)
 Border Line (1999) (co-production with Aviator Films)
 Fail Safe (2000) (co-production with Maysville Pictures)
 The Dukes of Hazzard: Hazzard in Hollywood (2000) (co-production with Kudzu Productions)
 Witchblade (2000) (co-production with Halsted Pictures, Image Comics, Mythic Films and Top Cow Productions)
 Shadow Realm (2002) (co-production with Angel/Brown Productions)
 The Big Time (2002) (co-production with John Wells Productions)
 The Lone Ranger (2003) (co-production with Turner Television)
 Evil Never Dies (2003) (co-production with Coote Hayes Productions and The Wolper Organization)
 L.A. Confidential (2003) (co-production with Regency Television and The Wolper Organization)
 Christmas Vacation 2: Cousin Eddie's Island Adventure (2003) (co-production with Elliot Friedgan & Company and National Lampoon)
 The Goodbye Girl (2004) co-production with TNT)
 Helter Skelter (2004) (co-production with Lakeside Productions and Wolper Organization)
 Growing Pains: Return of the Seavers (2004) (co-production with Green-Epstein-Bacino Productions)
 Samantha: An American Girl Holiday (2004) (co-production with Red Om Films, Revolution Studios and Sam Films)
 Dallas Reunion: The Return to Southfork (2004) (co-production with Henry Winkler/Michael Levitt Productions)
 Snow Wonder (2005) (co-production with The Wolper Organization and Without Santa LLC)
 Felicity: An American Girl Adventure (2005) (co-production with Revolution Studios, Red Om Films and American Girl)
 Knots Landing Reunion: Together Again (2005) (co-production with Henry Winkler/Michael Levitt Productions)
 Avenger (2006) (co-production with TNT, Radiant Productions and Appledown Films Inc.)
 Aquaman (2006)
 Molly: An American Girl on the Home Front (2006) (co-production with American Girl, Red Om Films and Revolution Studios)
 The Year Without a Santa Claus (2006) (co-production with The Wolper Organization)
 Sybil (2007) (co-production with Norman Stephen Productions and Wolper Organization)
 Poison Ivy: The Secret Society (2008) (co-production with CineTel Films, Insight Film Studios and New Line Cinema)
 Innocent (2011) (co-production with Frank von Zerneck Films and Mike Robe Productions)
 Dolly Parton's Christmas of Many Colors: Circle of Love (2016) (co-production with Dixie Pixie Productions and Magnolia Hill Productions)
 Hairspray Live! (2016) (co-production with New Line Cinema, Sony Pictures Television, Storyline Entertainment and Universal Television)
 The Bad Seed (2018) (co-production with Front Street Pictures, Lifetime, Loweprofile, The Wolper Organization and Warner Horizon Unscripted Television)
 Critters Attack! (2019) (co-production with Blue Ribbon Content and New Line Cinema)
 The Waltons: Homecoming (2021) (co-production with Magnolia Hill Productions)
 The Waltons: Thanksgiving (2022) (co-production with Magnolia Hill Productions)
 Dolly Parton's Mountain Magic Christmas (2022) (co-production with Sandollar Productions and Magnolia Hill Productions)

Warner Bros. International Television Production 
 The Windermere Children (2020) (co-production with Wall to Wall Media)

Warner Horizon Unscripted Television 
 A Christmas Story Live! (2017) (co-production with Marc Platt Productions and Turner Entertainment Co.)
 A West Wing Special to Benefit When We All Vote (2020) (co-production with Casey Patterson Entertainment and Shoe Money Productions)
 Friends: The Reunion (2021) (co-production with Bright/Kaufmann/Crane Productions and Fulwell 73 Productions)
 Scooby-Doo, Where Are You Now! (2021) (co-production with Warner Bros. Animation, Hanna-Barbera Cartoons and Abominable Pictures)
 Harry Potter 20th Anniversary: Return to Hogwarts (2021) (co-production with Casey Patterson Entertainment and Pulse Films)

Warner Bros. Animation

Hanna-Barbera

Ruby-Spears

Lorimar Television
 Aesop Fables (1971)
 The Crooked Hearts (1972)
 The Girls of Huntington House (1973)
 Dying Room Only (1973)
 Don't Be Afraid of the Dark (1973)
 The Blue Knight (1973)
 A Dream for Christmas (1973)
 The Stranger Within (1974)
 Bad Ronald (1974)
 The Runaway Barge (1975)
 The Runaways (1975)
 Returning Home (1975)
 Eric (1975)
 Conspiracy of Terror (1975)
 Widow (1976)
 Green Eyes (1977)
 The Prince of Central Park (1977)
 Killer on Board (1977)
 A Question of Guilt (1978)
 Desperate Women (1978)
 Long Journey Back (1978)
 Some Kind of Miracle (1979)
 Mr. Horn (1979)
 Marriage Is Alive and Well (TV Movie) (1980)
 The Waltons: A Decade of the Waltons (1980)
 Reward (1980)
 A Perfect Match (1980)
 Rape and Marriage: The Rideout Case (1980)
 A Matter of Life and Death (1981)
 Our Family Business (1981)
 Mistress of Paradise (1981)
 Killjoy (1981)
 Washington Mistress (1982)
 A Wedding on Walton's Mountain (1982)
 Desperate Lives (1982)
 Mother's Day on Waltons Mountain (1982)
 This Is Kate Bennett.. (1982)
 Two of a Kind (1982)
 Johnny Belinda (1982)
 One Shoe Makes It Murder (1982)
 A Day for Thanks on Walton's Mountain (1982)
 Pajama Tops (1983)
 One Cooks, the Other Doesn't (1983)
 An Uncommon Love (1983)
 The Winter of Our Discontent (1983)
 Why Me? (1984)
Spraggue (1984)
 Gulag (1985)
 Deadly Intentions (1985)
 Master Harold...and the Boys (1985)
 Blood & Orchids (1986)
 Dallas: The Early Years (1986)
 The Deliberate Stranger (1986)
 Circle of Violence: A Family Drama (1986)
 Love Among Thieves (1987)
 Shattered Innocence (1988)
 Glitz (1988)
 Desperate for Love (1989)
 The Outside Woman (1989)
 An Eight Is Enough Wedding (1989)
 Burning Bridges (1990)
 Hollywood Dog (1990)
 Deadly Intentions... Again? (1991)
 For the Very First Time (1991)
 Doublecrossed (1991)
 A Mother's Justice (1991)
 O Pioneers! (1992)
 Miss Rose White (1992)
 To Grandmother's House We Go (1992)
 A Killer Among Friends (1992)
 Just Mt Imagination (1992)
 Bloodlines: Murder in the Family (1993)
 Men Don't Tell (1993)
 Black Widow Murders: The Blanche Taylor Moore Story (1993)
 There Was a Little Boy (1993)
 A Walton Thanksgiving Reunion (1993)
 Island City (1994)

Cartoon Network Studios

Williams Street

Warner Bros. Television Studios UK

Hanna-Barbera Studios Europe

Ricochet 
 Too Big to Walk? (2006)
 The Greatest TV Shows of the Noughties (2009)
 Sex in Class (2015)
 Drinkers Like Me – Adrian Chiles (2018)
 The Data Doctor (2018)

Twenty Twenty Television 
 Dispatches: The War Crimes File (1995)
 Hellraisers (2000)
 Secrets of the Dead: Blood on the Altar (2002)
 Torture: The Guantanamo Guidebook (2005)
 Dispatches: Supermarket Secrets (2005)
 How to Divorce Without Screwing Up Your Children (2006)
 Dispatches: How to Beat Your Kid's Asthma (2006)
 Mum's Gone Gay (2007)
 Child Chain Smoker (2007)
 My Boyfriend, the Sex Tourist (2007)
 Whatever It Takes (2009)
 Shanties and Sea Songs with Gareth Malone (2010)
 50 Greatest Harry Potter Moments (2011)
 Young Nuns (2011) (co-production with Jerusalem Productions)
 Lawless (2013)
 Rich Kids Go Shopping (2016)
 Eurotrash EU Referendum Special (2016) (co-production with Rapido Television)
 Why Is Covid Killing People of Colour? (2021)

Wall to Wall Media 
 The Scandal Story (1989)
 The Real X-Files: America's Psychic Spies (1993)
 Bumping the Odds (1997) (co-production with Halcyon Productions)
 A Rather English Marriage (1998)
 Neanderthal (2001)
 Gunpowder, Treason and Plot (2001)
 Smallpox 2002 (2002)
 George Orwell: A Life in Pictures (2003)
 Agatha Christie: A Life in Pictures (2004)
 Oil Storm (2005)
 Ian Fleming: Bondmaker (2005)
 Elizabeth David: A Life in Recipes (2006)
 The Battle That Made Britain (2006)
 H. G. Wells: War with the World (2006)
 Discovery Atlas: France Revealed (2008)
 The Great Russian Art Room (2008)
 Backstairs Billy: The Queen Mum's Butler (2009)
 Who Killed Scarlett? (2009)
 Dispatches: The Big Job Hunt (2009)
 Dispatches: Rape in the City (2009)
 Journey to the Earth's Core (2011)
 The Girl (2012) (co-production with HBO Films)
 King of Coke: Living the High Life (2013)
 The Scandalous Lady W (2015)
 Gary Lineker: My Grandad's War (2019)
 The Windermere Children (2020) (co-production with Warner Bros. International Television Production)
 How to Keep a Healthy Weight with Michael Mosley (2021)
 David Baddiel: Social Media, Anger and Us (2021)
 Boobs (2022)

Renegade Pictures 
 Who Framed Jesus? (2010)
 Cherry Has a Baby (2010)
 Marathon Boy (2010) (co-production with One Horse Town Productions)
 Art in China (2014) (co-production with EOS Films)
 Evil Monkeys (2018) (co-production with The Story Lab)
 Doing Money (2018)
 The New Air Force One: Flying Fortress (2021) (co-production with Infinite Light Productions and The Boeing Company)

Rankin/Bass Animated Entertainment (post-1973) 
 The Year Without a Santa Claus (1974)
 'Twas the Night Before Christmas (1974)
 The First Christmas: The Story of the First Christmas Snow (1975)
 Rudolph's Shiny New Year (1976)
 The First Easter Rabbit (1976)
 The Little Drummer Boy, Book II (1976)
 Frosty's Winter Wonderland (1976)
 The Last Dinosaur (1977) (TV movie)
 The Easter Bunny Is Comin' to Town (1977)
 The Hobbit (1977) (TV movie)
 Nestor the Long-Eared Christmas Donkey (1977)
 The Bermuda Depths (1978) (TV movie)
 The Stingiest Man in Town (1978)
 Rudolph and Frosty's Christmas in July (1979) (TV movie)
 Jack Frost (1979)
 The Ivory Ape (1980) (TV movie)
 The Return of the King (1980) (TV movie)
 Pinocchio's Christmas (1980)
 The Leprechaun's Christmas Gold (1981)
 The Flight of Dragons (1982) (TV movie)
 The Sins of Dorian Gray (1983) (TV movie)
 The Coneheads (1983) (co-production with Broadway Video)
 The Life and Adventures of Santa Claus (1985)
 The Wind in the Willows (1987) (TV movie)

Turner Entertainment/Turner Pictures 
 How the Grinch Stole Christmas! (1966) (produced by MGM Television and Cat in the Hat Productions)
 The Dangerous Days of Kiowa Jones (1966) (produced by MGM Television and Youngstein & Karr Productions)
 The Scorpio Letters (1967)
 The Rise and Fall of the Third Reich (1968) (produced by MGM Television and Wolper Productions)
 Horton Hears a Who! (1970) (produced by MGM Television and Cat in the Hat Productions)
 Earth II (1971) (produced by MGM Television and Wabe)
 The Phantom of Hollywood (1974)
 Winter Kill (1974) (produced by MGM Television and Andy Griffith Enterprises)
 The Deadly Tower (1975)
 Babe (1975) (produced by MGM Television and Norman Felton/Stanley Rubin Productions)
 The Hostage Heart (1977) (produced by MGM Television and Andrews J. Fenady Productions)
 The Girl in the Empty Grave (1977) (produced by MGM Television and Manteo Enterprises)
 Deadly Game (1977) (produced by MGM Television and Manteo Enterprises)
 Death of a Centerfold: The Dorothy Stratten Story (1981) (produced by MGM Television and Wilcox Productions)
 Sweeney Todd: The Demon Barber of Fleet Street (1982) (produced by RKO Pictures)
 Treasure Island (1990)
 Conagher (1991)
 Miracle in the Wilderness (1991)
 Christmas in Connecticut (1992)
 The Heart of Justice (1992) (co-production with Amblin Television)
 Geronimo (1993)
 The Avenging Angel (1995)
 The Good Old Boys (1995)
 Riders of the Purple Sage (1996)
 The Man Who Captured Eichmann (1996)
 Last Stand at Saber River (1997)
 The Hunchback (aka The Hunchback of Notre Dame) (1997)
 Buffalo Soldiers (1997)
 Two for Texas (1998)
 Babylon 5: The River of Souls (1998)
 Babylon 5: Thirdspace (1998)
 CHiPs '99 (1998)
 Purgatory (1999)
 The Hunley (1999)
 You Know My Name (1999)
 The Virginian (2000)
 Freedom Song (2000)
 Running Mates (2000)
 Baby (2000)
 Crossfire Trail (2001)
 James Dean (2001)
 Door to Door (2002)
 Second String (2002)
 Monte Walsh (2003)
 Second Nature (2003)
 Word of Honor (2003)
 The Goodbye Girl (2004) (TV movie) (produced by Warner Bros. Television and Ron Ziskin Productions)
 The Librarian: Quest for the Spear (2004)
 The Librarian: Return to King Solomon's Mines (2006)
 Coma (2012) (miniseries) (produced by Warner Bros. Television, Sony Pictures Television and Scott Free Productions)
 Tom and Jerry: Santa's Little Helpers (2014) (produced by Warner Bros. Animation)
 A Christmas Story Live! (2017) (produced by Warner Horizon Television and Marc Platt Productions)

Castle Rock Entertainment 
 Heart & Soul (1988)
 The Ed Begley Jr. Show (1989)
 Julie Brown: The Show (1989)
 My Old School (1991)
 Please Watch the Jon Lovitz Special (1992)

New Line Television 
 Father and Scout (1994)
 Carmen: A Hip Hopera (2001)
 Brother's Keeper (2002)
 Wasted (2002)
 Just a Walk in the Park (2002)
 The Glow (2002)

HBO Entertainment 

 Pennsylvania Polka Festival (1973)
 Freddie the Freeloader's Christmas Dinner (1981)
 Reunion at Fairborough (1985) (co-production for Columbia Pictures Television)
 HBO Storybook Musicals (1987–1993)
 Lyle, Lyle, Crocodile: The Musical (1987)
 Alexander and the Terrible, Horrible, No Good, Very Bad Day (1990)
 The Tale of Peter Rabbit (1991)
 Montana (1990)
 Without Pity: A Film About Abilities (1996)
 How Do You Spell God? (1996)
 4 Little Girls (1997)
 Kids are Punny (1998)
 Goodnight Moon and Other Sleepytime Tales (1999)
 The Sissy Duckling (1999)
 Paradise Lost 2: Revelations (2000)
 Boycott (2001)
 61* (2001)
 Conspiracy (2001)
 Stranger Inside (2001)
 Dinner with Friends (2001)
 Shot in the Heart (2001)
 We Stand Alone Together (2001)
 Through A Child's Eyes: September 11, 2001 (2002)
 Normal (2003)
 My House in Umbria (2003)
 And Starring Pancho Villa as Himself (2003)
 Iron Jawed Angels (2004)
 Strip Search (2004)
 Something the Lord Made (2004)
 Dirty War (2004)
 Lackawanna Blues (2005)
 Sometimes in April (2005)
 Warm Springs (2005)
 The Girl in the Café (2005)
 Walkout (2006)
 Longford (2006)
 Life Support (2007)
 Bury My Heart at Wounded Knee (2007)
 Stuart: A Life Backwards (2007)
 Joe's Palace (2007)
 A Child's Garden to Poetry (2011)
 The Immortal Life of Henriettta Lacks (2017)
 The Number on Great-Grandpa's Arm (2018)

HBO Documentary Films

CNN 
 Desert Storm: The War Begins (1991)
 New Year's Eve Live (2001–present)
 Heaven's Gate: The Cult of Cults (2020) (co-production with Campfire and Stitcher)
 LFG (2021) (co-production with Everywoman Studios, Change Content, Propagate Content)
 The Lost Sons (2021) (co-production with Raw TV)

See also 
 List of All3Media television programmes
 List of libraries owned by Warner Bros. Discovery

Notes

References 

 
Warner
Warner Bros. Discovery-related lists